Heterallactis phlogozona is a species of moth of the family Erebidae. It is found in  Australia (the Northern Territory and Queensland) and Papua New Guinea.

Adults are yellow with brown basal and marginal areas on the forewings.

References

Moths described in 1904
Nudariina